Please Remain Seated is the twelfth studio album by English hard rock band Thunder. Recorded in late 2018 at Rockfield Studios in Monmouth, Wales, it was produced by the band's lead guitarist Luke Morley and released internationally by earMusic on 18 January 2019.

The album contains tracks that are a major reworking of songs from the band's back catalogue rather than brand new material.

Please Remain Seated debuted at number 8 on the UK Albums Chart, continuing the band's recent run of top 10 albums in the 2010s.

Recording and production
Inspiration for the album came from the band working on their track "Love Walked In" as a B-side for their Christmas 2017 single.

The title for the album reflects the mood of the music contained on the album, which is of a softer nature than many of their traditional tracks.

Critical reception

Andy Thorley of Maximum Volume Music gave the album a positive review, stating in conclusion "That really, exemplifies why this was always going to work. Thunder aren't afraid to take chances. Other bands have tried this sort of thing, and it's been something that no one but them could enjoy. "Please Remain Seated", however is the sound of one of the finest bands we have pleasing themselves but also having the skill to take everyone else along for the ride too.”

Commercial performance
Please Remain Seated debuted at number 8 on the UK Albums Chart.

Track listing

Personnel
Danny Bowes – vocals
Luke Morley – guitars, keyboards, backing vocals, production
Chris Childs – bass guitar
Gary "Harry" James – drums, percussion
 Ben Matthews - guitar & keyboards
Tom Oliver – keyboards
Emily Lynn – backing vocals
Lara Smiles – backing vocals

Charts

References

2019 albums
Thunder (band) albums
Edel AG albums
Albums recorded at Rockfield Studios